Sir Thomas Wolseley Haig KCIE CSI CMG CBE (7 August 1865 – 28 April 1938) was a civil servant in British India, then Professor at Trinity College, Dublin, and later a Scottish herald.

Early life
Haig was the son of Major Robert Wolseley Haig RA, FRS, (1830–72) the military astronomer, and Maria Georgina Brown. His maternal great-grandfather was Charles James Blomfield, Bishop of London. He was also descended from the Haigs of Bonnington, a branch of the Border house of Haig of Bemersyde, and was thus related to the first Lord Haig. He was educated at Wellington College, and then Sandhurst.

Army career
Haig joined the Seaforth Highlanders in 1884 and was transferred to the Indian Army in 1887 where he served in Upper Burma (1887–89) fighting "dacoits" (bandits). He won a medal and clasp for his service. He was promoted to Captain on 6 February 1895, and to Major on 6 February 1902.

Indian civil service
Haig entered the Berar Commission in 1892 and became Assistant Commissioner, then Deputy Commissioner, Inspector-General of Police, Jails, Stamps, Registration, and Excise, and Civil and Sessions Judge. He was officiating Secretary to the Board of Examiners, Fort William, 1897 and 1898–99. He entered the Political Department in 1901 as First Assistant to the Resident at Hyderabad, a post that gave him day to day control of Berar.

Haig became Assistant Secretary to the Government of India, Foreign Department, in 1907, then Political Agent in Alwar, 1907–08. Following the assassination of Sir Curzon Wyllie in London by Madan Lal Dhingra in 1909, Haig was appointed officiating Political ADC to the Secretary of State for India 1909–10 (Lord Morley).

Haig's final years abroad were spent mostly in Persia. He was the British Consul at Kerman in 1910, became First Assistant to the Agent to the Governor-General in Baluchistan in 1912 and quickly moved on to become Consul-General and Agent to the Government of India, Khurasan, Persia in 1914–16. He held the same post at Ispahan 1916 and Tehran 1919. He retired in 1920.

Academic career
Soon after Haig returned to Europe, he was appointed Professor of Arabic, Persian and Hindustani at Trinity College, Dublin. Later he was lecturer in Persian at the School of Oriental Studies, University of London. Haig was known for his meticulous attention to detail and the careful planning which went into his work. Some reviewers said that he tended to go too far and produce an overly-detailed end result, but his writings appeared in the Journal of the Royal Asiatic Society, and other learned societies, and he was assigned the third and fourth volumes of The Cambridge History of India. Unfortunately, he was only able to fully complete the third volume before illness set in and the fourth had to be completed by Richard Burn to Haig's plan. It was published in 1937, the year before Haig's death.

Haig made two important translations into English of Badaoni's Tarikh-i-Bada'uni (history), a source for the reign of Emperor Akbar's, and the Burhan-i-Massir of Tabatabai, an important source for the Nizam Shahi dynasty of Ahmadnagar.

Herald
Haig was appointed March Pursuivant of Arms in Scotland in 1923 and was Albany Herald 1927–35.

Personal life
Haig married Beatrice, older sister of Michael Lloyd Ferrar, ICS, in 1892. Beatrice died in 1927. They had one son (Robert Wolseley) who joined the Imperial Bank of Iran, and two daughters (Margaret Wolseley and Helen Ferrar).

Death
Haig died at home, in Kensington, London, on 28 April 1938 after a long illness.

Selected publications
Books
Hints on the study of Urdu, for the use of candidates for the lower and higher standard examinations in that language. Pioneer Press, Allahabad, 1898.
Historical landmarks of the Deccan. Pioneer Press, Allahabad, 1907.
The history of the Nizam Shahi kings of Ahmadnagar. British India Press/Education Society's Press, Bombay, 1923. (Reprinted from The Indian Antiquary, April 1920 – November 1923.)
The Cambridge history of India Vol. III Turks and Afghans. University Press, Cambridge, 1928. Edited by Wolseley Haig.
Persian grammar. Linguaphone Institute, London, c. 1930.
Persian. Linguaphone Institute, London, 1933. (With Darab Khan, Mojtaba Minovi and Ghulām Ḣusain) (third edition) (Linguaphone Oriental language Courses)
The Cambridge shorter history of India. University Press, Cambridge, 1934. Editor H.H. Dodwell. (contributor)
The Cambridge history of India Vol. IV The Mughul period. University Press, Cambridge, 1937. Planned by Wolseley Haig, edited by Richard Burn.
Other works
Various entries in The Encyclopaedia of Islam.
Contributions to the Persian Bible published in London by B. & F.B.S., 1928.

References

1865 births
1938 deaths
Academics of SOAS University of London
Academics of Trinity College Dublin
British Indian Army officers
British Indologists
British philologists
Commanders of the Order of the British Empire
Companions of the Order of the Star of India
Companions of the Order of St Michael and St George
Graduates of the Royal Military College, Sandhurst
Indian Civil Service (British India) officers
Knights Commander of the Order of the Indian Empire
People educated at Wellington College, Berkshire
Seaforth Highlanders officers
Scottish officers of arms